In October, 1982, three members of an anarchist urban guerrilla group known as Direct Action acted upon "their wish to end the arms race" and filled a stolen pick-up truck with  of dynamite and drove from Vancouver to Toronto, Canada planting the bomb outside Litton Industries, a manufacturer of American cruise missile components many feared would increase the risk of nuclear war. Although the militants had phoned to evacuate the building, the bomb was accidentally detonated several minutes before its announced deadline, injuring several bomb squad police officers and civilians in the vicinity.

Litton Industries' role
Litton Industries was conceived as a radio-engineering firm in 1934, but was purchased by Charles Bates Thornton, a Pentagon official with "all the right connections in the government and military", in 1956. Litton transformed into a military producer, building entire naval ships in their private shipyards, and installing their privately produced equipment, including communications and navigation systems.

Described as "the best known economic link between Canada and the nuclear arms race", Litton Industries' Rexdale plant was announced in October 1978 as one of two locations in the world that would be responsible for the manufacture of Terrain Contour Matching (TERCOM) guidance systems of the American Tomahawk cruise missile. The Canadian federal government had given Litton a $26.4 million grant, in addition to a $22.5 million interest-free loan specifically to allow them to bid competitively for the contract, drawing complaints from some members of the public for using federal funds to further the arms race. The American contract called for approximately 407 cruise missiles to be fitted with navigation systems by Litton Canada.

Planning

On the night of July 27, 1982, a British Columbia Department of Highways explosives storehouse north of Squamish was entered, and 38½ cases of dynamite were stolen. On September 13, a local hunter came upon two camouflaged and locked wooden structures that had been built in the forests of Garibaldi, near the site of the theft. One contained four reels of detonating cord and three boxes of electronic blasting caps, and the other building held 28½ cases of dynamite as well as explosive gelatin. This indicates that ten crates of dynamite were not stored in the wooden structures, to which Direct Action members Brent Taylor and Ann Hansen held keys.

The three associates stole a GMC van in the Greater Toronto Area on September 30, as well as an Oldsmobile and Chevrolet Chevelle three and four nights later respectively.

On the morning of October 14, just hours before the bombing, the Ontario Court of Appeals ruled that five Litton executives from the plant could not be called to testify by the defence counsel of 22 anti-nuclear activists who had been arrested for trespassing one year earlier.

Execution of the bombing
The bombing was carried out on October 14, 1982, using a van that was parked in a location partially concealed by shrubs, with a fluorescent "warning box" duct taped to the hood, displaying a message, a digital clock counting down, and a single stick of dynamite.

Belmas called the security desk and warned them that a dynamite bomb was placed in a van outside the building, and that it would detonate "in 15 to 20 minutes". She also told the guards to evacuate the plant, phone the local hotels to warn guests to stay away from windows to avoid injury and to have police close down passing roadways to limit the damage to Litton Industries.

The bomb detonated 11 minutes after the phone call. Speculation by local police constable Mitchell of the Toronto bomb squad three weeks after the bombing proposed that if responding officers had used radios, their use may possibly have triggered the detonation early.  A representative of Litton also confirmed that radios were used during the evacuation of the plant.

The explosion injured three members of the police, three passing motorists and five Litton employees, blowing out a 50-foot section of wall on the main two-story plant, and damaging two adjacent buildings. The cost of damages was described by police as being "in the millions". Damages were estimated anywhere from $3.87 million to $50 million.

On October 19, a 9-page communique was mailed to various organisations and media outlets. The first six pages were titled "Direct Action" and explained the philosophy of the group's actions. The remaining three pages were titled "Statement regarding the October 14 Litton Bombing" and included an explanation of the purpose of the bombing, as well as an apology for the injuries.

Aftermath

Although Litton Industries indicated that the bombing had not slowed production by more than a week, the bombing was hailed as a "massive success" by the anarchist movement who saw it as "an act of sabotage" against the American military machine. Although there was not wide public support for the bombing, Ann Hansen later pointed to the fact that 15,000 people attended a "Refuse the Cruise" demonstration two weeks after the bombing as evidence it had forced the public to confront Canada's role in the military–industrial complex. Others have concurred that the bombing did galvanize the population, who viewed the bombing as controversial or unnecessary, but took to the streets in greatly strengthened numbers to protest Canada complicity in the production of instruments of war. A month after the bombing, 700 people showed up at the Litton Industries plant to engage in "civil disobedience" despite police warnings.

In a statement following the event, Litton President Ronald Keating said, "Bombing is madness!" Organizers ridiculed this statement as hypocritical, considering Litton's nature as a defense contractor. Following the bombing, Litton increased their security budget by $2 million, money that Keating said "was money which could be put into our business to help make us more competitive".

The day after the bombing, an anonymous male telephoned Garrett Manufacturing, another defense contractor housed several blocks away in the same Toronto neighbourhood, to report that a bomb had been placed in the building; leading to an evacuation of the 15 personnel on-shift.

Two years later on the second anniversary of the action, the Belgian Cellules Communistes Combattantes (English: Communist Combat Cells) bombed Litton buildings situated in Evere, Brussels. A communique by the CCC claimed the attack for similar reasons to Direct Action, describing Litton as  'the designer, manufacturer and producer of the Cruise missile guidance system whose installation preparations are well underway on the site of the Florennes military base". It was the first claimed attack of the CCC's two year campaign. 

16 years later, due to purely financial considerations, Litton Industries lost their government contract to build the navigation systems to Kearfott Guidance & Navigation.

Investigation
Sgt. William Deconkey, of the Toronto Police, was put in charge of the investigation; and was said to have accepted offers from the U.S. Federal Bureau of Investigation and Central Intelligence Agency to help "hunt the terrorists".

In the days following the bombing, the Royal Canadian Mounted Police obtained approval for a 90-day Level IV operation against the Cruise Missile Conversion Project (CMPC), intended to determine the level of influence among known "subversives". The telephones of CMPC members, including Ken Hancock, were wiretapped for "some considerable time" according to Roy McMurtry, the Attorney General of Ontario. Hancock was also the subject of a police raid that seized four bags of documents, after his name surfaced in the diary of Ivan LeCouvie, another man who was arrested and then released by police.

Trials

Taylor, hailed as the "intellectual leader of the group" due to having written about the philosophy of guerrilla tactics and revolution, was sentenced to 9 years for the Litton bombing, to be served concurrently with the 22-year sentence he received for conspiracy to rob an armoured bank truck. Hansen, pleading guilty, was sentenced to 12 years for the Litton bombing, to be served concurrently with her life sentence for conspiracy to rob the bank truck, her six years for the bombing of the power station and several other mixed sentences for the firebombing of the pornography stores in Vancouver. Gerry Hannah and Doug Stewart, although sentenced to six and ten years respectively for other Direct Action activities, were not convicted of playing any role in the Litton bombing.

Some defenders of the group have suggested that the accused plead guilty to ensure the trial was not about who committed the action, but "to turn the trials into a political showcase, trotting out the evils of nuclear power, pornography and cruise missiles for all to see".

The judge ruled that Hansen's life sentence was merited because "her only remorse or regret is for the injury she caused the ten Litton Systems victims" and that she did not apologise for any of the group's property damage.

In arriving at the sentencing for the group, the judge declared:

I have no doubt that all of these people are well-motivated people working, if not struggling, against unfavourable odds to promote their respective causes... but the message must be crystal clear. Our Canadian way of life will not tolerate the use of fire, explosive substances or weapons as a means to furthering even worthy objectives.

Popular culture
The plot of the 1984 film Unfinished Business involves anarchists plotting to blow up a Toronto factory that produces parts for nuclear weapons.

References

Acts of sabotage
1982 crimes in Canada
Car and truck bombings in North America
Anarchism in Canada
1982 in Toronto
Attacks on buildings and structures in Canada
Terrorist incidents in Canada in the 1980s
Terrorist incidents in North America in 1982
Anti-nuclear protests
Anti–nuclear weapons movement
Nuclear cruise missiles of the United States
Canada–United States military relations
Cold War history of Canada
Guided missile manufacturers
History of Toronto